Tom Krauß (born 22 June 2001) is a German professional footballer who plays as a midfielder for Bundesliga club Schalke 04, on loan from RB Leipzig.

Club career
On 10 June 2022, Schalke 04 announced the signing of Krauß on loan from RB Leipzig with an obligation to buy for €3 million if Schalke avoid relegation in the 2022–23 season.

International career
Krauß has been playing for DFB junior teams since 2015. He was the captain of the  Germany U19 and was most recently nominated for the Germany U21 team.

Career statistics

Honours
Individual
Bundesliga Rookie of the Month: September 2022, February 2023

References

External links

 
 
 
 

2001 births
Living people
Footballers from Leipzig
German footballers
Association football midfielders
Germany under-21 international footballers
Bundesliga players
2. Bundesliga players
RB Leipzig players
1. FC Nürnberg players
FC Schalke 04 players